Adams Mill is a historic grist mill located at Democrat Township, Carroll County, Indiana. It was built in 1845–1846, and is a -story, rectangular frame building.  It measures approximately 45 feet by 50 feet, has a gable roof, and rests on a cut stone pier foundation.  It remained in commercial operation until 1952.  It is open to the public.

It was listed on the National Register of Historic Places in 1984.

References

External links

Adams Mill website

Grinding mills in Indiana
History museums in Indiana
Grinding mills on the National Register of Historic Places in Indiana
Industrial buildings completed in 1845
Buildings and structures in Carroll County, Indiana
National Register of Historic Places in Carroll County, Indiana
Museums in Carroll County, Indiana
Mill museums in Indiana